Baghdad Batteries (Orbsessions Volume III) is the ninth studio album released by ambient techno group The Orb in September 2009.

Track listing

References

External links
 

The Orb albums
2009 albums